St Paul's College is a Catholic secondary school for boys owned by the Marist Brothers and located in the central Auckland suburb of Ponsonby on a spacious 7.3 hectare campus. The Marist Brothers first opened a school on the site (Sacred Heart College) in 1903. St Paul's College (named after the apostle Paul) commenced operations in 1955..

The school

The college, which became a State-integrated school in 1982, makes full use of its extensive grounds in sporting and other activities. The school offers the standard intermediate and secondary school curriculum leading, for the senior year levels, to the National Certificate of Educational Achievement assessment system (NCEA). The school has good pass rates in NCEA. The college excels in sport, especially Rugby football and in Polynesian and other cultural activities, notably in the annual ASB Polyfest competitions. The Marist Brothers, the proprietors of the school, maintain a small community of non-teaching brothers on the campus to encourage the continuation of the Marist charism.

Ethos
The school aims to incorporate students' families in the life of the college and to encourage the spirit of independence and personal responsibility amongst the students. The school roll has grown as the college continues "exhorting students" to "exam success" and "altruistic action."

Houses
The names and colours of the St Paul's College Houses are:

 Xavier, named for Francis Xavier – red
 Champagnat, named for Marcellin Champagnat – yellow
 Lavalla, named for La Valla-en-Gier where the Marist Brothers were founded — blue
 Aquinas, named for Thomas Aquinas – green

History
The Marist Brothers arrived in Auckland in 1885 and began operations on the site of previous schools in Pitt St in the Auckland city centre. In the 1890s they began teaching secondary classes there but it became evident that the Pitt St site was too small and noisy. By 1900 negotiations were underway with Bishop Lenihan who arranged for the brothers to lease part of a block of land of 48 acres (10 hectares) near Cox's Creek in Ponsonby. This land had been gifted to the Diocese of Auckland in 1851 by Hugh Coolahan, an Auckland Catholic businessman. He had come from Ireland and had prospered during the early days of Auckland's commercial development. He had been a member of the building committee for St Patrick's Church (later the cathedral) and was a founding member of the board of St Peter's School in Pitt St. The Marist Brothers leased 7.3 hectares of the land at £30 a year for a 42-year term.

The school, Sacred Heart College, was opened on 21 June 1903. The first building was a large three storied building with a prominent encompassing verandas. It was built from brick resting on concrete foundations.  The bricks were coated in white plaster which later became grey with age. This building was a prominent landmark and became the main school building of St Paul's College until it was demolished in 1980.

The site required much development. A gully ran through the middle of the property and the land was very unevenly contoured. Some of the land was farmed by the college. Over time the land was levelled, grassed and drained and other buildings were gradually built. In 1955 the complete campus and buildings was taken over by St Paul's.  But by the 21st century, the only Sacred Heart College structures left at St Pauls were a classroom, the old infirmary and a statue of the Sacred Heart. However the campus's well-wooded character testifies to its historic character.

It was only on 4 September 1946 that the Marist Brothers had acquired the freehold of the St Paul's College Richmond Rd site. On 14 June 1946 the site was vested in the New Zealand Marist Brothers' Trust Board and there was a small ceremony and Bishop Liston was thanked by the Marist Brothers. One brother later observed, perhaps sardonically, that the Marist Brothers had been paying for the land for over forty years and had effected great improvements.

The school operated as St Paul's College after Queen's Birthday 1955 (from Tuesday 7 June) under the same motto "Confortare esto vir". The same traditions were faithfully upheld as they had been for the previous 50 years. Many sons of old boys preferred to attend St Paul's in the following years, both because it was more central and because their fathers had attended school there. The school maintained a substantial roll into the 1970s. On 8 August 1982, when the school was integrated it had a roll of 330 (280 in the secondary section and 50 in the middle or intermediate school), but this was increased in 1998 to a maximum roll of 400. However, with the establishment of other secondary schools in the school's traditional catchment, enrolment numbers declined. Many of the families associated with the school moved out of the local area as the socio-economic character of suburbs adjacent to the school changed although many still sent their sons to St Paul's by bus, mostly from South Auckland. The school was attempting to attract the sons of the new local demographic as well as the college's traditional supporters. In 2015 a 1700 square metre slice of unused school land was sold to fund new class rooms, an administration block and a new middle school was opened in 2018. The middle school block was expected to gradually enable St Paul's to increase its roll.

Headmasters
 Br. Brian Wanden (Br Anselm) "Headmaster at St Paul's College for many years"
 Denys Marra (1991 - 2009)
 Mark Rice (2009 - 2016) 
 Kieran Fouhy (2016 - 2021)
 Keith Simento (2021 - present)

Notable alumni

The arts
 David Fane – actor
 Malo Luafutu (aka Scribe) – musician
 Brendan Perry – musician, member of group Dead Can Dance
 Feleti Strickson-Pua – professional musician
 Lemi Ponifasio – director, artist, dancer, designer and choreographer

Business
 Mark Hotchin, company director

 Ron Holland, yacht designer

Politics and public service
Dail Jones (born 1944), lawyer, Member of Parliament (1978–1984 and 2002–2008)
Tuilaepa Aiono Sailele Malielegaoi (born 14 April 1945), sixth Prime Minister of Samoa (1998–2021).
 Lautafi Fio Selafi Purcell - Samoan politician and former Cabinet Minister; member of the Human Rights Protection Party.
 Lefau Harry Schuster (born 1965) - Samoan politician and Cabinet Minister; member of the FAST Party.

Sport

Olympians
David Aspin Wrestling −1972, 1976
John Leonard Canoeing 1976

Cricket
 Sebastian Kohlhase – first-class cricketer, sports administrator and businessman

Kick-boxing
 Jason Suttie – Muay Thai Kingboxing champion player

Rugby league
 Bunty Afoa professional rugby league player
 Paki Afu – Parramatta Eels rugby league player
 Mark Elia – New Zealand Rugby League Kiwi
 Maurie Fa'asavalu – Manu Samoa Rugby player, St Helens Rugby League
 Sosaia Feki – NZ Warriors Rugby League Player
 Pita Godinet – Auckland Warriors rugby league player
 Mark Graham – rugby league player, former captain of the Kiwis
 Siliva Havili – rugby league player
 Nuko Hifo –  professional rugby league player
 Stacey Jones – New Zealand Warriors rugby league player
 Phillip Leuluai Cronulla Sharks 
 Sam Lousi – New Zealand Warriors rugby league player
 Sione Lousi – New Zealand Warriors rugby league player
 Tu'u Maori – Papua New Guinea National Rugby League 2008 Rugby League World Cup team, Newtown Jets, Sydney Roosters under 20's, (previously played for Cronulla Sharks, Melbourne Storm, and Richmond Rovers).
 Manu Ma'u – Parramatta Eels rugby league player
 Arden McCarthy – rugby league player; Fullback/wing/centre position; current Club, Vodafone Warriors (previously played for Cronulla Sharks and Richmond Rovers).
 Francis Meli nz warriors St. Helens rugby league player
 Jirah Momoisea - Parramatta Eels Rugby League Prop/Second Rower
 Siose Muliumu (born 1976) professional rugby league player; played for Whitehaven, the United States, and the New Zealand Warriors.
 Dane O'Hara – professional rugby league player (Hull)
 Agnatius Paasi – Nz Warriors Rugby League player
 John Palavi- NZ Warriors rugby league player
 Jerome Ropati – New Zealand Warriors rugby league player
 Nafe Seluini – Penrith Panthers rugby league player
 Michael Sio – Auckland Warriors, Toa Samoa Rugby League World Cup 2013
 David Solomona – Bradford Bulls rugby league player
 Shannon Stowers – NZ Warriors Rugby League Player
 Mark Taufua – Newcastle Knights – Cronulla sharks
 Elijah Taylor – Auckland Warriors rugby league player 
 Ben Te'o – Brisbane Broncos rugby league player
 Starford To'a - West Tigers rugby league winger/centre/fullback
 Evarn Tuimavave – New Zealand Warriors rugby league player (Prop Forward)
 Christian Tuipulotu - Manly Warringah Sea Eagles Rugby League winger/centre
 Joe Vagana – Auckland Warriors rugby league player
 Nigel Vagana – Auckland Warriors rugby league player
 Daniel Vasau  –  Rugby league international, represented Tonga at the 2000 World Cup
 Greg Wolfgramm  –  Rugby league international, represented Tonga at the 2000 World Cup

Rugby union
 Edwin Cocker New Zealand Rugby Union Sevens Player – Auckland Rugby Union
 Colin Farrell –  All Black (1977), Auckland representative (1974–1981)
 Bernie Fraser – All Black rugby union player
 Liaki Moli – Rugby Union player for the Auckland Blues (2012–2014) and the Japanese Sunwolves (2016 – present)
 Isaia Tuifua – Professional Rugby Union player
 Legi Matiu (born 1969) – played for France at lock and number eight (2000) & for the French Barbarians (1998)
 Ben Te'o Rugby union player for Leinster (European domestic comp) 2014–15, Worcester warriors (English prem) 2016–present (England national and British Irish lions) 2016–present

Notes

References and sources

 Jenny Carlyon & Diana Morrow, Urban Village: The Story of Ponsonby, Freemans Bay and St Mary's Bay, Random House, Auckland, 2008.
 Pat (Patrick Owen) Gallagher, The Marist Brothers in New Zealand, Fiji & Samoa, 1876–1976, New Zealand Marist Brothers' Trust Board, Tuakau, 1976.
 Matt McEvoy, The Grey Lynn Book: The life and times of New Zealand's most fascinating suburb, Paul Little Books, Auckland, 2016, pp. 149–153 (Chapter 29, "Change of Heart – Saint Paul's College")
 E.R. Simmons, In Cruce Salus, A History of the Diocese of Auckland 1848 – 1980, Catholic Publication Centre, Auckland 1982.
 Tony Waters, Confortare, A History of Sacred Heart College, Auckland 1903 – 2003: a Marist Brothers secondary school, Sacred Heart College, Auckland, 2003.

External links
 St Paul's College website
 All Blacks website, St Paul's College All Blacks
 Catholic Diocese of Auckland
 Catholic Church in New Zealand

Boys' schools in New Zealand
Educational institutions established in 1955
Marist Brothers schools
Catholic secondary schools in Auckland